Zatta is a village in central Ivory Coast. It is in the sub-prefecture of Kossou, Yamoussoukro Department, Yamoussoukro Autonomous District.

Prior to the department being abolished in 2013, Zatta was in the Yamoussoukro Department. Zatta was a commune until March 2012, when it became one of 1126 communes nationwide that were abolished.

Notes

Former communes of Ivory Coast
Populated places in Yamoussoukro